

The Mohawk M1C (variously named Pinto, Redskin or Spurwing) was a 1920s American two or three-seat low-wing monoplane designed and built by Mohawk Aero Corporation of Minneapolis, Minnesota. One M1C was evaluated by the United States Army Air Corps in 1930 as the YPT-7 Pinto for use as a primary trainer.

Design and development
The M1C was a three-seat low-wing cantilever monoplane which was available with an open cockpit (as the Pinto) and enclosed cockpit (as the Redskin). The first variant was the M1C-K powered by a  Kinner K-5 or a  Wright engine. One aircraft was modified for evaluation by the United States Army Air Corps as the YPT-7 Pinto.

A two-seat variant the M1C-W was also produced with a  Warner Scarab engine. The first one was the aircraft evaluated by the Army and re-engined. In 1930 the company went bankrupt and was taken over by the R R Rand Jr.

Variants
M1C-K
Kinner K-5 powered variant, five built.
M1C-W
Warner Scarab powered variant, one modified from M1C-K and two more built.
YPT-7
United States Army Air Corps designation for one M1C-K for evaluation in 1930 the Kinner K-5 engine given the military designation YR-370-1.

Specifications (M1C-K)

See also

References

Notes

Bibliography

 
 

1920s United States civil utility aircraft
Low-wing aircraft
Single-engined tractor aircraft
Aircraft first flown in 1929